Sherwin Bitsui is a Navajo writer and poet. His book, Flood Song, won the American Book Award and the PEN Open Book Award.

Life and Education
Bitsui was born in 1974. He is originally from Whitecone, Arizona.

He holds an AFA from the Institute of American Indian Arts Creative Writing Program. He is the recipient of the 2000-01 Individual Poet Grant from the Witter Bynner Foundation for Poetry, the 1999 Truman Capote Creative Writing Fellowship, a Soul Mountain Residency, a Lannan Foundation Literary Residency Fellowship and a 2006 Whiting Award. In 2012, he was honored with an NACF Artist Fellowship in Literature. He has served in visiting faculty positions, including distinguished visiting, Eminent Writer for the University of Wyoming, Visiting Hugo Writer University of Montana, and San Diego State University, where he has been on creative writing faculty since 2013. Since 2013, he has served on the faculty of the Institute of American Indian Arts in the Low Residency MFA in Creative Writing program.

He currently lives in Tucson, Arizona.

Published works
Sherwin has published poems in American Poet, The Iowa Review, Frank (Paris), Lit Magazine, and elsewhere. His poems were also anthologized in Legitimate Dangers: American Poets of the New Century and Sing: Poetry from the Indigenous Americas.

A common theme within Bitsui's poems is the exploration of different values, concepts and ideas become when experienced in Navajo as opposed to English.

His book, Flood Song, was published in 2009 and won an American Book Award in 2010. His most recent book of poetry, Dissolve, was published in 2018.

Poetry
 Dissolve, Copper Canyon Press. 2018.

References

External links

 Profile at The Whiting Foundation

1975 births
Living people
21st-century American poets
American Book Award winners
Institute of American Indian Arts alumni
Native American poets
Native American painters
Navajo people
People from Fort Defiance, Arizona
People from Holbrook, Arizona
20th-century Native Americans
21st-century Native Americans